William Moloughney (born 1932) is an Irish retired hurler who played as a full-forward for the Tipperary senior team.

Moloughney made his first appearance for the team during the 1959 championship and was a regular member of the starting fifteen for three full seasons. During that time he won one All-Ireland medal, one Munster medal and two National Hurling League medals.

At club level Moloughney enjoyed a lengthy career with Kildangan.

References

1932 births
Living people
Kildangan hurlers (Tipperary)
Tipperary inter-county hurlers
All-Ireland Senior Hurling Championship winners